William Victor McIntyre (24 May 1887–11 March 1964) was a New Zealand shepherd, farmer, dog breeder and handler. He was born in Pleasant Point, South Canterbury, New Zealand on 24 May 1887.

References

1887 births
1964 deaths
New Zealand farmers
People from Pleasant Point, New Zealand